Arturo de la Rosa Macapagal (14 September 1942 – 11 August 2015) was the son of Philippine President Diosdado Macapagal. He was a Filipino shooter who competed at the 1972 and 1976 Summer Olympics at the free pistol event.

Early life
Macapagal was the son of President Diosdado Macapagal and Purita de la Rosa, sister of Rogelio and Jaime. Purita was Diosdado Macapagal's first wife. Arturo was the second child and eldest son among the Macapagal family. Cielo was his elder sister. His mother died when he was just 1 year old and his father married Evangeline Macaraeg Macapagal when he was five years old. His father had two children with Evangeline, Gloria Macapagal Arroyo and Diosdado Macapagal Jr.

Education
Macapagal entered San Beda College for a bachelor's degree in business management and graduated from the institution as a cum laude in 1968. During his last year at San Beda, he was president of the student council. He later entered the Asian Institute of Management (AIM) and attained his master's degree in business management in 1971 from the institution. He became the first president of AIM's student association and the first chairman of its alumni association.

Sporting career

As a shooter
Macapagal represented the Philippines in shooting on several competitions including at the 1972 and 1976 Summer Olympics where he participated at the free pistol event. During his 1972 Olympic stint he established a national record for free pistol, a record which would not be broken for 21 years, the longest in the country's shooting history. He was chosen as the "Most Outstanding Shooter of the Decade" by the Philippine Olympic Committee in 1980. In 1973 and 1974, he was named the All-around Filipino Sports Awardee by the Philippine Sportswriters Association.

As an official
Macapagal also led the Philippine National Shooting Association for many years and also served the Philippine Olympians Association as president. In 2008 he ran for the position of president at the Philippine Olympic Committee, challenging incumbent Jose Cojuangco who has been President of the Association  since 2004 and was seeking a second term. Macapagal lost to Cojuangco by 2 votes with Macapagal receiving 19 votes and Cojuangco receiving 21 out of 40 votes cast. Cojuangco managed to win a third term in 2012.

Business career
Macapagal became the president and CEO of Toyota Pasong Tamo, one of Toyota's largest dealers and also became the chair of Majal Properties Inc. and Melandrex Holdings Inc. He was also an active member of several business organizations such as the Financial Executives Institute and the Management Association of the Philippines.

He was also given awards by the alumni association of his former colleges. In 1979, the AIM Alumni Association gave Macapagal the triple-award for Outstanding Achievements in Management and in 1995 he was given the Centennial Award for Outstanding Achievement in Business and Management by the San Beda Alumni Association, on the occasion of the Centennial of the Benedictine Monks in the Philippines.

Politics
Macapagal received many offers to enter politics. In 1971, Governor Jose Lingad asked for Macapagal to run as governor of Pampanga, in 1987; by Governor Bren Guiao to run a congressman and in 1992 as Guiao's vice governor. He declined to enter politics.

Social involvement
In 1963, Macapagal and some of his friends established the Scholarship Foundation of the Filipino Youth and served as its chairman. The scholarship foundation grants college scholarship to high school students with financial difficulties that it deems as talented. He is also a trustee of the St. Anthony College of Technology in Mabalacat, Pampanga and a member of Habitat  Philippines, with the later being an organization that provides housing for the poor.

Personal life
Macapagal was married to Maria Therese Jalandoni who came from Iloilo whom he had three children.

Death
Macapagal died on 11 August 2015 at age 72. He was hospitalized at the Makati Medical Center for prostate cancer.

References

External links
 

1942 births
2015 deaths
Filipino male sport shooters
Olympic shooters of the Philippines
Shooters at the 1972 Summer Olympics
Shooters at the 1976 Summer Olympics
San Beda University alumni
20th-century Filipino businesspeople
Filipino chief executives
Sportspeople from Pampanga
Deaths from prostate cancer
Deaths from cancer in the Philippines
Shooters at the 1974 Asian Games
Children of presidents of the Philippines
Arturo
Kapampangan people
Asian Institute of Management alumni
Asian Games competitors for the Philippines